Man from Another Time is the fourth album by Seasick Steve. It was released on October 19, 2009. It entered the UK Albums Chart at number 4 on October 25, 2009.

Track listing
 "Diddley Bo"
 "Big Green and Yeller"
 "Happy (To Have a Job)"
 "The Banjo Song"
 "Man from Another Time"
 "That's All"
 "Just Because I Can (CSX)"
 "Never Go West"
 "Dark"
 "Wenatchee"
 "My Home (Blue Eyes)"
 "Seasick Boogie"
 "Livin' on the Outside" [*]
 "Them Roses" [*]
 "I'm So Lonesome I Could Cry" (hidden track featuring Amy LaVere on vocals, not on vinyl version)

Tracks marked [*] only appear on deluxe edition.

Charts

References

External links
 Man from Another Time official website.

2009 albums
Seasick Steve albums